Lucille Mary Ash McClure (born May 26, 1935) is an American former figure skater who competed in pairs with Sully Kothmann.  They twice captured the silver medal at the United States Figure Skating Championships and competed at the 1956 Winter Olympics. She was born in Colorado Springs, Colorado.She attended Colorado College and was a member of Kappa Alpha Theta.

Results
(with Kothmann)

References

Sports-Reference.com

1935 births
American female pair skaters
Olympic figure skaters of the United States
Figure skaters at the 1956 Winter Olympics
Living people
21st-century American women
20th-century American women